Hadjadj is a town and commune in Mostaganem Province, Algeria. According to the 1998 census it has a population of 15,835.

References

Communes of Mostaganem Province
Mostaganem Province